Waihopai Valley is an area near Blenheim in the Marlborough region of the South Island of New Zealand.  The Waihopai River drains the area.

The Government Communications Security Bureau operates what it describes as a satellite communications monitoring facility in the Waihopai Valley, which it calls GCSB Waihopai.  It has been identified as being a part of ECHELON, the worldwide network of signals interception facilities run by the UKUSA consortium of intelligence agencies.

The lower Waihopai, as it runs into the Wairau Valley, has a number of vineyards. From 1925 to 1927 small hydroelectric power station was built in the valley. It is now operated by TrustPower.

References

Geography of the Marlborough Region
Populated places in the Marlborough Region